The third-generation Jeep Grand Cherokee (WK) is a mid-size SUV manufactured and marketed by Jeep since the 2005 model year. It was unveiled at the 2004 New York International Auto Show and subsequently in Europe at Euro Camp Jeep in Ardèche, France.

Major features included Quadra-Drive II four-wheel drive, rear-seat DVD player, and optional 5.7 L Hemi V8 engine. The 3.7 L V6 engine replaced the 4.0 L straight-6 engine. Notably, the WK featured independent front suspension.

In 2008, the WK received a minor facelift with revised headlights and high intensity discharge (HID) Headlamps with auto leveling. The lower portion of the front bumper became removable to increase the approach angle for off-road use.

The engine uses variable valve timing to increase fuel economy.

Models 

 2005–2010 –  Laredo (not in Europe)
 2005–2010 –  CRD (Europe)
 2005–2010 –  Limited
 2006–2009 –  Overland
 2006–2010 –  SRT-8
 2007–2008 –  CRD (NAFTA)

The Laredo was the base trim level of the Grand Cherokee between September 19, 2004, and 2010. Standard features included: the 3.7L Power-Tech V6 engine with 5-speed automatic transmission, seventeen-inch (17") alloy wheels, a full-sized spare tire and spare wheel, cloth seating surfaces, a 6-way power front driver's seat, an A/M-F/M stereo with CD player (and later, an auxiliary audio input jack), 6 speakers, black body-side inserts and front and rear bumper inserts (both chrome in 2010), remote steering wheel-mounted audio system controls, a driver's information center (VIC), keyless entry, and more. Many features available on the luxurious Limited trim were also available on the base Laredo trim level.

The Limited added these features to the base Laredo trim: a full-sized matching spare wheel, dual power front bucket seats, premium leather seating surfaces, an A/M-F/M stereo with six-disc CD/MP3 changer, a premium 276-watt Boston Acoustics sound system with 6 speakers, heated front bucket seats, a leather-wrapped steering wheel, chrome body-side inserts and front and rear bumper inserts, driver's 2-position memory, a rear-mounted fold-down center console, and more. The standard engine between 2005 and 2009 was the 4.7L Power-Tech V8 engine, while the standard engine in 2010 was the 3.7L Power-Tech V6 engine.

The Rocky Mountain and 65th Anniversary Edition were "value-added" trim levels of the Grand Cherokee for model years 2005, 2007, 2008, and 2009 (Rocky Mountain) and 2006 (65th Anniversary Edition). These trim levels added the following features to the base Laredo trim: power driver's bucket seat, unique cloth seating surfaces with special embroidery, embroidered carpeted floor mats, chrome body-side inserts, an AM-FM stereo with six-disc CD/MP3 changer, a premium 276-watt Boston Acoustics sound system with 6 speakers, special emblems on both front doors, special seventeen-inch (17") alloy wheels, a full-size spare, fog lights, and power double-function sunroof.

The S Limited added these features to the Limited trim: unique alloy wheels, "S" emblems on both front doors, the 5.7L HEMI V8 engine, unique premium perforated leather-and-suede seating surfaces, a GPS navigational system stereo, and more.

The Overland was the top-of-the-line trim level of the Grand Cherokee between 2006 and 2009. It added these features to the Limited trim: seventeen-inch (17") (2005-2007) or eighteen-inch (18") chrome-clad alloy wheels (these wheels could be downgraded to seventeen-inch (17") alloy wheels from 2007 to 2009), a GPS navigational system radio, Bluetooth with voice command for phone, 'Overland' badges on the tailgate, the 5.7L HEMI V8 engine, side airbags, leather-and-suede seating surfaces with 'Overland' embroidery, a sunroof, and more. The Overland took a hiatus for MY 2010, returning on the next-generation WK2 Grand Cherokee in model year 2011.

The SRT-8 was the "performance-oriented" Grand Cherokee trim level from December 20, 2005, to 2010. It added these features to the Limited trim: twenty-inch (20x9 front & 20x10 rear—U.S. spec; Four 20x8 Euro spec) polished "Alcoa" forged aluminum alloy wheels, twenty-inch (20") Good Year Eagle F1 performance tires (Goodyear Eagle RS-A EMT run flat tires: 255/45R20 front & 285/40 rear—U.S. Spec), leather-and-suede performance seating surfaces, a sunroof, a 6.1L HEMI V8 engine, mandatory 4X4, a body kit, a center-mounted dual exhaust system, 'SRT' emblems on both front doors and the tailgate, performance-tuned suspension, a special instrument cluster, carbon fiber interior trim, and more.

Engines

Notes 

 The 4.7 L High Output engine that first appeared with the Grand Cherokee Overland WJ was dropped from the Jeep lineup. It was used in the Dodge Dakota and Dodge Ram 1500. A dedicated High Output version was dropped as a result.
 The WK was known as a WH in international (i.e. non-US) markets.
 The 5.7 L HEMI engine for 2005-2008 has slightly less horsepower than those found in the Dodge Ram or the Dodge Charger (330 vs 345) due to different engine control unit (ECU) programming.
 The 3.0 L diesel ceased production for North America at the end of 2008.  The late production models with diesel engines are commonly referred to as 2008.5 models.  They can not be stamped as 2009 models due to more restrictive diesel emissions standards.

SRT-8 

An SRT-8 (Street & Racing Technology V8) version of the Grand Cherokee debuted at the 2005 New York International Auto Show. Powered by a  version of the 6.1 L Hemi, it also features upgraded Brembo brakes, large dual performance exhaust with polished tips (exiting out the middle of the rear), Bilstein performance gas charged shocks and modified suspension components, Mercedes-Benz NAG1 (WA580) 5-speed transmission, unique NV146 transfer case, specially designed electronic all-wheel-drive system and interior and exterior updates. A drive shaft from a diesel application, fortified Dana 44 rear differential, and 11.2" (285 mm) wide Goodyear tires in the rear (10" or 255 mm in the front) complement the performance package. The sports tuned suspension allows the Jeep SRT8 to develop 0.92 g on the skid-pad.

Such numbers made the SRT-8 Grand Cherokee the fastest accelerating vehicle within the SRT-8 lineup, second only to the Dodge Viper SRT10 among all SRT vehicles.

To improve on-road handling and decrease weight, off-road gear has been removed. The SRT-8 uses an NV146 transfer case, which uses an electronic-applied clutch pack to transfer 0-50% of torque to the front axle but has no low-range or manual controls.  The front and rear differentials are both open, with no limited-slip capability. Its ride stance is significantly lower and the front fascia spoiler gives the vehicle  of ground clearance. A total of 14,921 Jeep Grand Cherokee SRT8s were manufactured.

Models 

Laredo: The Laredo served as the entry-level Grand Cherokee model offering an A/M-F/M radio with single-disc CD player (later, an auxiliary audio input jack was also added), seventeen-inch alloy wheels, power windows, door locks, side mirrors, and driver's seat, lumbar support, keyless entry with security system, cloth seating surfaces, tinted windows, and six speakers. Features such as leather seating surfaces, heated front seats, side airbags, a Boston Acoustics premium sound system, a navigation system and a CD and MP3 changer, as well as a CD/MP3/Cassette combo could be added to further enhance this model.

Limited: Limited trim added an A/M-F/M radio with six-disc in-dash CD changer, a Boston Acoustics premium sound system, full-sized spare tire, and leather seating surfaces. Features such as a sunroof, heated front seats, and chrome wheels could also be added.

Overland: The Overland added Uconnect Hands-Free Bluetooth technology, a six-disc in-dash CD/MP3 changer with navigation system, satellite radio, leather and suede seats, heated front seats, a sunroof, and chrome wheels.

Diesel 

In Europe, South America, South Africa and Australia, a V6 CRD engine produced by Mercedes-Benz was available from the Grand Cherokee (WK) introduction in 2005:
 OM642 3.0 L CRD V6 Turbo Diesel with Variable geometry turbocharger (VGT).

In North America the 3.0 CRD was available for the 2007 and 2008, however the rest of the world - i.e. UK, Europe  Australia etc., it had the Mercedes sourced engine for the production life of the vehicle from 2005. The Mercedes-Benz sourced unit meets stringent Euro 4 Emission standards without the need for a diesel particulate filter - which hampers vehicle efficiency, however - it includes a diesel particulate filter (North America only) to further reduce exhaust emissions. It was not however available for sale in California or certain Northeast states, due to new stricter emissions regulations for non-commercial vehicles. Vehicles could be bought used in California and Northeast states, as the regulations only applied to new vehicles.

This engine is also used in the majority of Mercedes-Benz vehicles: C-Class, CLS, E-Class, S-Class, ML-Class, GLK-Class, GL-Class, G-Class, R-Class, the Vito / Viano, and the Dodge / Freightliner / Mercedes-Benz Sprinter.

Changes for the 2005-2010 Jeep Grand Cherokee WK 

Throughout its five-model-year production run, the Jeep Grand Cherokee WK received many changes:

Launched on September 19, 2004, for the 2005 model year, the Grand Cherokee WK was all-new, following a 5-year development process from 1999 to 2004. The 3.7L Powertech V6 engine replaces the 4.0L Powertech Inline Six-Cylinder (I6) engine, and now produces a full 210 horsepower, up 15 horsepower from before. This engine is only available on the base Laredo trim level. The 4.7L Power-Tech High-Output V8 engine is replaced by a newly available 5.7L HEMI V8 engine featuring Multi-Displacement System (MDS), which allows the Grand Cherokee to run on four cylinders while at cruising speeds to increase fuel economy ratings. The new engine produces 345 horsepower (this engine is only available on the top-of-the-line Limited trim level). The standard 4.7L Power-Tech V8 engine, optional on the base Laredo trim level, and standard on the top-of-the-line Limited trim level, carries over from the previous-generation WJ Grand Cherokee, and still produces 235 horsepower. Seventeen-inch (17") tires and alloy wheels are standard on all models. The Electronic Vehicle Information Center (EVIC) moves from the overhead console to the instrument cluster, with controls now located in the center stack, making it easier for the driver to make changes to the settings while the vehicle is in motion. A Mercedes-Benz sourced five-speed automatic transmission is standard with the V6 and SRT8 engines, though the 545RFE five-speed automatic transmission carries over on the 4.7 and 5.7L V8-equipped Grand Cherokees. The all-new Grand Cherokee also gets the latest infotainment systems, which include an available full-color 5.8" GPS navigational system, the U Connect hands-free Bluetooth telephone system, Sirius Satellite Radio, and a rear seat DVD entertainment system, known as the Video Entertainment System (VES), which also included a pair of wireless IR headphones. A six-speaker, 276-watt Boston Acoustics premium sound system also replaces the Infinity Gold system. All four-wheel-drive systems are now computer assisted for higher traction control, and a Quadra-Drive II a four-wheel-drive system is now available on most all Grand Cherokees (See other Wiki page on Quadra-Drive 2 for more accurate information). The Selec-Trac manual four-wheel-drive system has been discontinued. A Rocky Mountain Edition trim level went into production on March 1, 2005, going on sale in late April 2005, and concluding at 9,500 examples on May 31, 2005.

For MY 2006, production started on July 5, 2005, and concluded on June 30, 2006. Sales began in September 2005. A 65th Anniversary Edition was introduced, which temporarily replaced the Rocky Mountain Edition trim level. The Overland trim level was new, as was an SRT-8 trim level that went into production on November 5, 2005, and went on-sale December 20, 2005. The A/M-F/M stereo with both cassette player and six-disc, in-dash CD/MP3 changer is discontinued. A new 3.0L CRD Diesel V6 engine debuts for both the Limited and Overland trim levels in mid-2006.

For MY 2007, production started on July 17, 2006 (SRT-8, early August) and concluded on July 13, 2007. Sales began on September 1, 2006. The base Grand Cherokee Laredo gains exterior color-keyed door handles and rear brow, and revised tail lamps. The 26F and 28F Packages for the base Laredo trim level are now discontinued, though a 28E Package is now available for Laredo, for those who desire a base model with a V8 engine. The Rocky Mountain Edition returns for 2007. In some states, the 4.7 L PowerTech V8 engine is now FlexFuel-capable, and can now run on E85 Ethanol.

For MY 2008, production commenced on July 16, 2007, and concluded on July 11, 2008. A mid-cycle restyling was launched on September 1, 2007, with a revised front clip, and new tire and wheel combinations. A revised interior includes the latest infotainment systems, including touch-screen radios, as well as Sirius Backseat TV for rear seat passengers, a new steering wheel, a revised gauge cluster, and revised interior trim. The seat fabrics and trims are revised on all models. Midyear, the 4.7 L PowerTech V8 gets a power boost, now producing 305 horsepower, up 70 horsepower from its previous power rating. The 3.0L CRD Diesel V6 engine is also discontinued midyear 2008. Heated rear seats are now an option on some models, as is a 115 V AC household-style power outlet. The 5.7 L HEMI V8 engine also gets a power boost, now producing 360 horsepower, up 15 horsepower from its previous power rating.

For MY 2009, production began on August 11, 2008, and concluded on August 10, 2009. The 3.0L CRD Diesel V6 engine was discontinued, while an S Limited trim level, which had been available in Europe, was introduced to the United States.

For MY 2010, production began on August 17, 2009, with WK production ending on March 12, 2010. The 4.7L PowerTech V8 engine and Overland trim level were omitted. The S Limited trim level is also discontinued, as is the Rocky Mountain Edition trim level. The base Laredo trim level gains the option of a 5.7 L HEMI V8 engine, and the Limited trim level gains the option of a 3.7 L PowerTech V6 engine, following the discontinuation of the 4.7 L PowerTech V8 engine for all Grand Cherokee models.

2008 Refresh 

For 2008, the Grand Cherokee received a mid-cycle refresh. A revised front fascia included a new front grille, revised headlamps, as well as a new front bumper. In the rear, the 2008 Grand Cherokee received new tail lamps, and all models (except the SRT-8) received new wheel and tire combinations. The interior was also completely restyled, with newly-designed front bucket seats, and new seating materials. The steering wheel was redesigned, and the instrument cluster received a facelift, with green backlighting changed to white. New aluminum and woodgrain interior trim was also available depending upon trim level selection. The traditional integrated keyless entry remote and key was replaced by the new "FOBIK" keyless entry remote that included a redesigned ignition slot. Radios were also redesigned, with a 6.5-inch touchscreen display on select models, SiriusXM Travel Link available with the top-tier 730N GPS navigation radio, as well as voice activation, and an integrated U Connect Bluetooth hands-free phone system. SiriusXM Satellite Radio was also now standard equipment on all models. In the rear, a newly-available 115-Volt household-style power outlet was included on select models, as well as heated outboard rear seats. The rear DVD entertainment system was redesigned to feature a larger LCD display screen, as well as SiriusXM Backseat TV compatibility. All powertrains remained identical to the 2007 models, although 2008 would be the final year for the 3.0L CRD (Common Rail Diesel) V6 engine.

Safety

Euro NCAP

Insurance Institute for Highway Safety (IIHS)

NHTSA

Recall
May 2013: Chrysler recalled the Grand Cherokee over a rollaway risk.

Notes

References

External links

 

Grand Cherokee (WK)
All-wheel-drive vehicles
Mid-size sport utility vehicles
Crossover sport utility vehicles
Euro NCAP large off-road
2010s cars
Cars introduced in 2004
Motor vehicles manufactured in the United States